A list of films produced by the Israeli film industry in 1959.

1959 releases

See also
1959 in Israel

References

External links
 Israeli films of 1959 at the Internet Movie Database

Israeli
Film
1959